Chentangzhuang Subdistrict is a subdistrict situated on the east of Hexi District, Tianjin, China. It borders Fumin Road and Wanxin Subdistricts in the northeast, Liulin Subdistrict in the east, Shuanglin Farm and Donghai Subdistrict in the south, as well as Jianshan and Guajiasi Subdistricts in the west. It had 59,256 people residing under its administration in 2010.

The subdistrict was created in 1954, and it incorporated Xiaohaidi Subdistrict in 2000. The name Chentangzhuang literally means "Chen Pond Villa".

Geography 
The subdistrict borders Hai River to its northeast, and is intersected by Fuxing River. Both Dongnan Banhuan Expressway and Dagu South Road go through it.

Administrative divisions 
At the time of writing, Chentangzhuang Subdistrict oversees 14 residential communities, which are listed as follows:

References 

Township-level divisions of Tianjin
Hexi District, Tianjin